Wyoming Highway 391 (WYO 391) is a short , albeit signed, Wyoming State Road for the Wyoming Department of Transportation (WYDOT) Maintenance Shop for the Jackson Area.

Route description
Wyoming Highway 391 travels from US 26/US 89/US 189/US 191 west to the Jackson Area WYDOT Maintenance Shop where it ends. The roadway continues past the maintenance shop as Evans Road.

Major intersections

See also
Wyoming Highway 224

References

External links 

Wyoming State Routes 300-399
WYO 391 - US-26/US-89/US-189/US-191 to WYDOT Office
Wyoming Department of Transportation

Transportation in Teton County, Wyoming
391